The list of current and past Rajya Sabha members from the Himachal Pradesh State. State elect 3 member for the term of 6 years and indirectly elected by the state legislators, since year 1956.

Current Members
Keys:

List of all Rajya Sabha members from Himachal Pradesh state 
Chronological list by last date of appointment

See also
List of Lok Sabha Members from Himachal Pradesh

References

External links
Rajya Sabha homepage hosted by the Indian government
List of Sitting Members of Rajya Sabha (Term Wise) 
MEMBERS OF RAJYA SABHA (STATE WISE RETIREMENT LIST) 

Himachal Pradesh
 
Rajya Sabha